Pimpirev Beach is the portion of the northwest coast of South Bay, Livingston Island, Antarctica bounded to the southwest by Ereby Point and to the northeast by the north corner of the bay marked by an ice sea cave located 5.8 km east-northeast of Ereby Point and 1.45 km northwest of Aleko Point.

The shoreline, extending 6.5 km in a west-southwest to east-northeast direction, is formed by a narrow beach under the Pimpirev Glacier’s terminus; a number of minor disruptions occur with segments of the ice cap penetrating the sea. Featuring Smolyan Point, a cape located 1.9 km northeast of Ereby Point and ending up with a 25 m wide and 4 m high rock, with conspicuous radial crevasses spreading inland. The central portion of the coast is indented for 250 m by a nameless 710 m wide cove behind Rongel Reef.

The beach takes its name from the adjacent Pimpirev Ice Wall, respectively Pimpirev Glacier.

Location

Maps
 L.L. Ivanov. Livingston Island: Central-Eastern Region. Scale 1:25000 topographic map.  Sofia: Antarctic Place-names Commission of Bulgaria, 1996.
 L.L. Ivanov et al. Antarctica: Livingston Island and Greenwich Island, South Shetland Islands. Scale 1:100000 topographic map. Sofia: Antarctic Place-names Commission of Bulgaria, 2005.
 L.L. Ivanov. Antarctica: Livingston Island and Greenwich, Robert, Snow and Smith Islands. Scale 1:120000 topographic map.  Troyan: Manfred Wörner Foundation, 2009.

References
 Pimpirev Beach. SCAR Composite Antarctic Gazetteer
 Bulgarian Antarctic Gazetteer. Antarctic Place-names Commission. (details in Bulgarian, basic data in English)

External links
 Pimpirev Beach. Copernix satellite image

Beaches of Livingston Island
Bulgaria and the Antarctic